Tore Johansen (born 23 December 1977) is a Norwegian jazz trumpeter and the younger brother of drummer Roger Johansen. He has worked with Chick Corea, Karin Krog, Kenny Wheeler, Steve Swallow, Lars Jansson, Hal Galper, Siri Gellein, and Jan Gunnar Hoff.

Career
Johansen was born in Bodø. As a teenager, he played in the Bodø Jazz Quintet with his brother Roger Johansen and saxophonist Atle Nymo. In 1994 he started his first band with his brother, Terje Venaas (double bass,) and Einar Thorbjørnsen (piano), and joined Bodø Big Band (1994–96) led by saxophonist Henning Gravrok.

He was educated at Trondheim Musikkonservatorium where he became a lecturer. He has played with the Swedish saxophonist Nisse Sandström and has appeared with Karin Krog. He has performed with Swedish pianist Lars Jansson and the Finnish alto saxophonist Jukka Perko. With American pianist Hal Galper he recorded at Norwegian radio NRK P2 for the program Jazzklubben (2004) from the jazz club Blå in Oslo. He toured with Trondheim Jazz Orchestra and Chick Corea in the U.S., Scandinavia, and Japan. This was documented on the album at Midtnorsk Jazzsenters' s label, MNJ Records. Other collaborators include Kenny Wheeler in 2008 and Steve Swallow in 2009.

Johansen often works with musicians from Northern Norway, e.g. with Bjørn Alterhaug (double bass), Jan Gunnar Hoff (piano), Finn Sletten (drumes) and Ole Morten Vågan (bass). With Ole Morten Vågan he was part of guitarist Hallgeir Pedersen's Trio at Moldejazz in 2002. This band was extended to a quartet, including his brother Roger Johansen (drums). They performed with Norwegian folk singer Terje Nilsen at Trondheim Jazz Festival in 2006 and the nonet Lars Gullin tribute with John Pål Inderberg (baritone saxophone) and Lars Sjösten (piano). Johansen has also worked extensively in a duo format with pianist Vigleik Storaas, documented on Rainbow Session (2007).

Award and honors
 2002: Nordlandsprofil at Nordland Musikkfestuke
 2002: Nordnorsk Jazzsenter's trainee scheme 2002-2004
 2005: Norsk Kulturråd's ensemble support
 2005: Recipient of the Stubøprisen

Discography
 Man, Woman and Child (Gemini, 2000)
 Happy Days (Gemini, 2002)
 Windows (Gemini, 2003)
 Like That (Gemini, 2005)
 Rainbow Session (Inner Ear, 2007)
 Thad Jones Tribute (Normann, 2008)
 Jazz Mass (Inner Ear, 2009)
 I.S. (Inner Ear, 2010)
 Natt, Stille (Inner Ear, 2010)
 Nord (Inner Ear, 2011)
 Double Rainbow (Inner Ear, 2012)
 Open Minds (Inner Ear, 2012)
 Alvin Pang with Endre Lund Eriksen (Inner X, 2013)
 The Set (Inner Ear, 2014)
 Earth Stills (Inner Ear, 2015)
 Sang (Inner Ear, 2020)

References

External links

Tore Johansen Biografi at Inner Ear
Stubøprisen 2005
Tore Johansen at Myspace

1977 births
Living people
Musicians from Bodø
20th-century Norwegian male musicians
20th-century Norwegian trumpeters
21st-century Norwegian male musicians
21st-century Norwegian trumpeters
Gemini Records artists
Inner Ear artists
Male jazz composers
Male trumpeters
Norwegian jazz composers
Norwegian jazz trumpeters
Norwegian University of Science and Technology alumni
Trondheim Jazz Orchestra members